The Liberal Socialists Party was a political party in Egypt, initially affiliated to the Arab Socialist Union.

History and profile
The party was established in 1976. Its leader was Mustafa Kamel Murad. He led the party until his death in 1998.

In the 2000 parliamentary elections, the party won 1 out of 444 seats in the Majlis al-Sha'ab. However, at the following elections in 2005, it failed to win any seats. It was part of the National Democratic Alliance for Egypt during the 2011-2012 parliamentary elections.

There were official media outlets of the Liberal Socialist Party, including Al Ahrar and Al Nour.

Platform 
 Sharia is a main source of legislation.
 Freedom of expression and thought.
 Election the President and Vice-President through free elections.
 Enhancing role of the private sector.
 Ensuring basic rights of labourers and peasants.
 Freedom of the press.
 Independence of the judiciary.
 Development of education.

Electoral history

People's Assembly of Egypt elections

See also 

 Liberalism in Egypt

References

External links
Egypt government

1976 establishments in Egypt
2011 disestablishments in Egypt
Defunct political parties in Egypt
Islamic political parties in Egypt
Liberal parties in Egypt
Political parties disestablished in 2011
Political parties established in 1976
Sunni Islamic political parties
Liberal socialism